The Rongbatsa Agreement of 1918 was signed following the victory of Tibetan Army, the military force of the de facto independent Tibet at the time under Kashag, against the Beiyang government of Republic of China. The treaty demarcated the border between China and Tibet, along the Yangtze River, with two enclaves for Tibet on the left bank of the river. China later denounced the treaty.

Following China's refusal to recognize the agreement reached in Simla Convention in 1914, conflict resumed in the autumn of 1917 after China arrested and killed two Tibetan soldiers in Chamdo. Facing military defeat, China requested British diplomat Eric Teichman to help broker the ceasefire agreement and the three parties signed an initial agreement in May 1918, before ultimately signing this final agreement in August 1918 which also defined the border between China and Tibet, and was supplemented by another agreement in October 1918.

However, the treaty was later denounced by China.

References

External links
 Agreement for the Restoration of Peaceful Relations Between China and Tibet (1918), 19 August 1918.
 Supplementary Agreement Regarding Mutual Withdrawal of Troops and Cessation of Hostilities Between Chinese and Tibetans (1918), 10 October 1918.

China–Tibet relations
India–Tibet relations
Tibet–United Kingdom relations
Treaties of the United Kingdom (1801–1922)
Treaties of China
Treaties of Tibet
1918 treaties